Anton Christian "Tom" Kaak (born 31 March 1978) is a Dutch former professional footballer who played in The Football League for Darlington. He also played for Clydebank in Scotland.

References

1978 births
Living people
Dutch footballers
Darlington F.C. players
Clydebank F.C. (1965) players
English Football League players
People from Winterswijk
Footballers from Gelderland
Scottish Football League players
Dutch expatriate footballers
Expatriate footballers in England
Expatriate footballers in Scotland
Association football forwards
Dutch expatriate sportspeople in Scotland
Dutch expatriate sportspeople in England